Daniel James Ventre (born 23 January 1986 in Liverpool) is an English former footballer who played as a midfielder. He is currently a first-team coach at Bristol Rovers.

He has previously played in  the Football League for Accrington Stanley, and from 2007 to 2013 had played in the League of Ireland for Sligo Rovers.

Career

England
His only previous clubs were Accrington Stanley and Chester City, although he only made first-team appearances for Accrington. He helped Stanley win the Conference National in 2005–06 and played for them in the Football League the following season.

Accrington Stanley
Ventre joined Accrington Stanley after a successful trial period in 2005 after his release from Chester City. He went on to appear 15 times for Accrington Stanley over the Conference winning season at the age of 19. After Promotion to the Football League he earned a one-year contract. Ventre could not force his way into the first team so went out on a one-month loan to Southport playing three games. He was recalled back to Accrington Stanley where he broke into the first team. He played four games before he took a bad fall in a game against Bury on Boxing day 2006 fracturing his left leg. He was out injured for 10 weeks. Ventre appeared once more time for Stanley, before being released to find regular first team football.

Sligo Rovers
Ventre joined Sligo Rovers in July 2007 and made his debut against Shamrock Rovers, which Sligo Rovers went on to win 2–0. He scored his first goal for the Bit o' Red against Cobh Ramblers earlier this season scoring Sligo's second goal in a 3–1 victory. Ventre has captained the team on many occasions including in the 2009 FAI Cup final defeat and was one of three players that captained the club during the 2010 season who lifted both the FAI Cup and League of Ireland Cup trophies. The fans voted him as their player of the year for the 2009 season. His first goal came against Shelbourne in the previous round of the League Cup, while his first league goal came against Bray Wanderers in September. The 2012 season saw him captain Sligo Rovers to their first title in 37 years.

Derry City
Ventre then joined Derry City from Sligo Rovers on 18 December.

AFC Telford United
Danny joined AFC Telford United on 27 January 2015 until the end of the season.

Later career
Later in his career he played for Warrington Town, Skelmersdale United, Droylsden and Widnes.

Coaching career
In November 2020, Ventre was appointed first-team coach at Widnes where he combined this role with his existing role as a player. Ventre also held the role of Blackpool Under-18s manager alongside this role.

In July 2022, Ventre was appointed as first-team coach at Bristol Rovers.

Honours
Accrington Stanley
Conference National (1): 2005–06

Sligo Rovers
League of Ireland (1): 2012
FAI Cup (3): 2010, 2011, 2013
League of Ireland Cup (1): 2010

Career statistics

Club
Correct as of 7 November 2011.

References

External links

1986 births
Living people
Sportspeople from Chester
English footballers
Association football midfielders
Chester City F.C. players
Accrington Stanley F.C. players
Southport F.C. players
Sligo Rovers F.C. players
Derry City F.C. players
AFC Telford United players
Warrington Town F.C. players
Skelmersdale United F.C. players
Droylsden F.C. players
Widnes F.C. players
League of Ireland players
English Football League players
National League (English football) players
League of Ireland XI players
English expatriate footballers
English expatriate sportspeople in Ireland
Expatriate association footballers in the Republic of Ireland
Association football coaches
Blackpool F.C. non-playing staff
Bristol Rovers F.C. non-playing staff